A content format is an encoded format for converting a specific type of data to displayable information. Content formats are used in recording and transmission to prepare data for observation or interpretation. This includes both analog and digitized content. Content formats may be recorded and read by either natural or manufactured tools and mechanisms.

In addition to converting data to information, a content format may include the encryption and/or scrambling of that information. Multiple content formats may be contained within a single section of a storage medium (e.g. track, disk sector, computer file, document, page, column) or transmitted via a single channel (e.g. wire, carrier wave) of a transmission medium. With multimedia, multiple tracks containing multiple content formats are presented simultaneously. Content formats may either be recorded in secondary signal processing methods such as a software container format (e.g. digital audio, digital video) or recorded in the primary format (e.g. spectrogram, pictogram). 

Observable data is often known as raw data, or raw content. A primary raw content format may be directly observable (e.g. image, sound, motion, smell, sensation) or physical data which only requires hardware to display it, such as a phonographic needle and diaphragm or a projector lamp and magnifying glass.

There has been a countless number of content formats throughout history. The following are examples of some common content formats and content format categories (covering: sensory experience, model, and language used for encoding information):

See also
Communication
Representation (arts)
Content carrier signals
Content multiplexing format
Content transmission
Wireless content transmission
Data storage device
Recording format
Data compression
Analog television: NTSC, PAL and SECAM

References

Computer-mediated communication
Mass media technology
Data management
Recording
Film and video technology
Sound production technology